The 1972 AMA Motocross Championship season was the 1st AMA Motocross National Championship season.

Summary
1972 marked the inaugural year for the AMA Motocross National Championship. Brad Lackey dominated the 500cc class ahead of Gary Jones and Wyman Priddy. In 1972, after the season-ending 500cc race on September 2, American riders competing for the AMA national championship continued to accumulate points counting towards the national championship while they competed in the 1972 Trans-AMA motocross series which began on October 1 and hosted visiting European riders from the Motocross World Championship.

Jones claimed the 250cc championship ahead of his Yamaha teammate, Jimmy Weinert.

Nationals

500cc

Trans-AMA Series

250cc

Final standings

See also
 1972 Trans-AMA motocross series

References

External links
 AMA Motocross web site 
 Motocross National Championship web site 

AMA Motocross Championship Season
AMA Motocross Championship Season
AMA Motocross Championship